UniCredit Bank Austria AG, branded and widely referred to as Bank Austria, is an Austrian bank, 96.35% owned by Milan-based UniCredit. It was formed in 1991 by merger of Vienna's Länderbank and Zentralsparkasse, acquired Creditanstalt-Bankverein in 1997, and merged with it to form Bank Austria-Creditanstalt (BA-CA) in 2002. Its name reverted to Bank Austria in 2008, as UniCredit, the bank's owner since 2005, phased out the history-laden Creditanstalt brand.

History

Bank Austria was formed in 1991 by the merger of the troubled Länderbank and Vienna's Zentralsparkasse, in practice a takeover of the former by the latter led by its general director ; the merged entity became Austria's largest bank. In 1996, the Austrian government announced the privatization of Creditanstalt-Bankverein, in which it held a majority stake. In January 1997, Bank Austria acquired the stake for about 1.25 billion euros. In turn, Bank Austria sold a majority stake it held in GiroCredit for 8.24 billion schillings (about 600 million euros) to Erste Bank. In February 1998, the state sold its last shares and the remaining shares on the market were exchanged with shares in Bank Austria, and Creditanstalt was delisted from the Vienna Stock Exchange.

In stages from 2000 to 2002, HVB Group took over Bank Austria. Subsequently in 2002, Bank Austria's shares were delisted, and Bank Austria and Creditanstalt merged to form Bank Austria-Creditanstalt. An assets exchange procedure led to the transfert of HVB's assets in central and eastern Europe to Bank Austria, and reversely. The new BA-CA's shares were offered to the public through an IPO in 2003.

In June 2005 Italian group UniCredit announced the acquisition of HypoVereinsbank, along with BA-CA. Restructuring led to the creation of a new holding for BA-CA foreign assets in eastern Europe, the transformation of the Polish activity to a full affiliate, the shrinking of BA-CA per se to a smaller market, and the shrinking of HVB to the German market. In order to respect cartel restriction in Croatia, BA-CA's affiliate Splitska banka was sold to Société Générale, for UniCredit already owned Zagrebačka banka. BA-CA acquired Koç Finansal Hizmetler (Turkey), Zagrebačka banka (Croatia), Bulbank (Bulgaria), Živnostenska banka (Czechia), UniBanka (Slovakia) and UniCredit Romania from UniCredit in that operation.

In 2006 BA-CA continued its expansion in Russia by acquiring remaining shares in International Moscow Bank and 100% of institutional business of Aton Capital - a Russian brokerage. Moreover, Kazakh bank ATFBank was acquired in 2007.

Since 31 March 2008, the bank has been operating under the brand name "Bank Austria" and has a new logo to show the connection to the UniCredit Group. It had the strongest capital base among the large banks in Austria, its Core Tier 1 ratio amounted to 10.55% and its Total Capital ratio to 12.7% as of 31 December 2011.

In 2016, UniCredit took back from Bank Austria direct ownership of its affiliates in Central and Eastern Europe. Also as of 2016, Bank Austria was managed by CEO Robert Zadrazil, and its Chairman was Erich Hampel.

Controversy

The 2000s saw the bank in the middle of substantial litigation around trustee Rudolfine Steindling's transfer of former East German, now German, money to her own accounts. In 2010 a Swiss court ruled  that the predecessor Länderbank had broken the law by aiding her to channel away the money and had to pay €240 million but a higher court overruled this decision on formal grounds.

See also

 Erste Group
 Raiffeisen Bank International
 Banking in Austria
 List of banks in Austria
 List of investors in Bernard L. Madoff Securities

References

External links
 

Banks of Austria
UniCredit subsidiaries
Companies based in Vienna